Joseph Raymond Sarnoski (January 31, 1915 – June 16, 1943) was an officer of the United States Army Air Forces during World War II, and received the Medal of Honor posthumously.

Sarnoski was part of the flight crew of Capt. Jay Zeamer Jr. on Old 666 on the day where both he and Zeamer earned the Medal of Honor.

Life and career

Childhood
Sarnoski was the second-oldest in a family of seventeen children belonging to a Polish coal miner in Simpson, Pennsylvania, just north of Carbondale.  His father's health began to fail and he left the coal mines to begin farming where Joseph Sarnoski worked hard to help keep the farm operating and make ends meet. The family later moved to nearby White's Crossing, where Sarnoski graduated from high school. Though the responsibility of alternating between education and farm work left little free time, Sarnoski developed an interest in aviation.

Military career
On March 7, 1936, Sarnoski enlisted in the United States Army as an air cadet, entering service in Baltimore, Maryland. After basic training he was assigned to the 2nd Bomb Group at Langley Field, Virginia, with additional training at Lowry Field, Colorado, where he completed the Advanced Aircraft Armorer's Course in 1939.

In 1940, he was discharged from the Regular Army to reenlist in the Air Corps in order to train as an air crewman, completing the Bombsight Maintenance Course.  Sarnoski was promoted to Sergeant, made an enlisted bombardier in B-17 Flying Fortress bombers, and returned to Langley as part of the 41st Reconnaissance Squadron, attached to the 2nd Bomb Group.

While stationed at Langley Sarnoski met and married his wife, Marie, and was promoted to Staff Sergeant early in 1941.  In September 1941 Sarnoski was transferred to Dow Field, Bangor, Maine, as a bombing instructor with the 65th Bombardment Squadron, 43rd Bomb Group, newly equipped with B-17s. With the entry of the United States into World War II, Sarnoski's group was transferred to Australia on January 13, 1942, where in March he was promoted to technical sergeant.  Sarnoski continued to act primarily as an instructor but did fly some combat missions and earn promotion to Master Sergeant. In November 1942, now based at Port Moresby, New Guinea, he volunteered to become part of a combat crew put together by 1st Lt. Jay Zeamer Jr.

Sarnoski was awarded the Silver Star in combat and by recommendation of his pilot received a battlefield commission to second lieutenant on May 24, 1943.

Medal of Honor mission

On June 16, 1943, Sarnoski, normally a bombardier, volunteered to fly as one of the crew of B-17E, AAF Ser. No. 41-2666, Old 666 on an unescorted mission to Buka, a small island off the north coast of Bougainville, a 1200-mile round-trip mission, to photograph Japanese installations and map the west coast of Bougainville as far south as Empress Augusta Bay in preparation for Allied landings scheduled for early November 1943 in World War II. Apparently unbeknownst to Allied intelligence, the Japanese had moved about 400 fighters into the Solomon Islands on June 15.

The photo reconnaissance mission was without incident, although the B-17's crew reported observing 20 fighters taking off from Buka airfield. The bomber continued south to the mapping run and shortly before its completion, the B-17 was intercepted by five Japanese fighters attacking from the front. Though wounded in the attack, Sarnoski continued to fire his nose gun, shooting down two fighters. A 20-millimeter cannon shell exploded in the nose compartment of the B-17, severely wounding Sarnoski and knocking him completely out of the compartment. Sarnoski dragged himself back to his station and continued to fire until he died at his position.

The B-17 eventually landed successfully in New Guinea after Sarnoski died.  Jay Zeamer Jr. was also awarded the Medal of Honor, the only instance of World War II when two members of one crew were honored for separate acts of heroism in the same combat engagement.

This mission has been recreated by The History Channel as part of Episode 12 of its series Dogfights, "Long Odds", first telecast January 19, 2007.

Burial and remembrances
On January 6, 1949, two days after the first interment at the new cemetery, Sarnoski's body was returned from its burial location on New Guinea and interred in Section A, Grave 582 of the National Cemetery of the Pacific at  Honolulu, Hawaii.

Merli-Sarnoski State Park, located in Fell Township (just outside of Carbondale), Pennsylvania, was co-named for Joseph Sarnoski and Gino J. Merli in 2002; both were World War II Medal of Honor recipients and Lackawanna County residents.

A street on the Basic Military Training side of Lackland AFB, Texas has also been named for 2nd Lt Sarnoski.

A military parade field alongside the 43d Airlift Group's headquarters on Pope Field, part of Fort Bragg, North Carolina, was named in 2nd Lt Sarnoski's honor in 2008.  In 2012, a parking lot was built over a majority of the field.

Military Decorations
His decorations include:

Medal of Honor citation
The President of the United States in the name of The Congress takes pleasure in presenting the Medal of Honor to

SARNOSKI, JOSEPH R.
(Air Mission)

Rank and Organization: Second Lieutenant, U.S. Army Air Corps, 43rd Bombardment Group, Place and Date: Over Buka Area, Solomon Islands, June 16, 1943. Entered Service at: Simpson, Pa.  Born. January 30, 1915, Simpson, Pa. G.O. No.: 85, December 17, 1943.

Citation:
For conspicuous gallantry and intrepidity in action above and beyond the call of duty. On 16 June 1943, 2d Lt. Sarnoski volunteered as bombardier of a crew on an important photographic mapping mission covering the heavily defended Buka area, Solomon Islands. When the mission was nearly completed, about 20 enemy fighters intercepted. At the nose guns, 2d Lt. Sarnoski fought off the first attackers, making it possible for the pilot to finish the plotted course. When a coordinated frontal attack by the enemy extensively damaged his bomber, and seriously injured 5 of the crew, 2d Lt. Sarnoski, though wounded, continued firing and shot down 2 enemy planes. A 20-millimeter shell which burst in the nose of the bomber knocked him into the catwalk under the cockpit. With indomitable fighting spirit, he crawled back to his post and kept on firing until he collapsed on his guns. 2d Lt. Sarnoski by resolute defense of his aircraft at the price of his life, made possible the completion of a vitally important mission.

See also

List of Medal of Honor recipients for World War II

References
Notes

BIbliography

External links

1915 births
1943 deaths
People from Lackawanna County, Pennsylvania
American people of Polish descent
Recipients of the Silver Star
United States Army Air Forces Medal of Honor recipients
United States Army Air Forces personnel killed in World War II
United States Army Air Forces officers
World War II recipients of the Medal of Honor
Aviators killed in aviation accidents or incidents
Aviators killed by being shot down
Burials in the National Memorial Cemetery of the Pacific
Military personnel from Pennsylvania
Recipients of the Air Medal